Cynthia Ellen Nixon (born April 9, 1966) is an American actress, activist, and theater director. For her portrayal of Miranda Hobbes in the HBO series Sex and the City (1998–2004), she won the 2004 Primetime Emmy Award for Outstanding Supporting Actress in a Comedy Series. She reprised the role in the films Sex and the City (2008) and Sex and the City 2 (2010), as well as the television show And Just Like That... (2021–present). Her other film credits include Amadeus (1984), James White (2015), and playing Emily Dickinson in A Quiet Passion (2016).

Nixon made her Broadway debut in the 1980 revival of The Philadelphia Story. Her other Broadway credits include The Real Thing (1983), Hurlyburly (1983), Indiscretions (1995), The Women (2001), and Wit (2012). She won the 2006 Tony Award for Best Actress in a Play for Rabbit Hole, the 2008 Primetime Emmy Award for Outstanding Guest Actress in a Drama Series for Law & Order: Special Victims Unit, the 2009 Grammy Award for Best Spoken Word Album for An Inconvenient Truth, and the 2017 Tony Award for Best Featured Actress in a Play for The Little Foxes. Her other television roles include playing political figures Eleanor Roosevelt , Kade Prenall in NBC Hannibal Warm Springs (2005), Michele Davis in Too Big to Fail (2011), and playing Nancy Reagan in the 2016 television film Killing Reagan. In 2020 she appeared in the Netflix drama Ratched.

On March 19, 2018, Nixon announced her campaign for Governor of New York as a challenger to Democratic incumbent Andrew Cuomo. Her platform focused on income inequality, renewable energy, establishing universal health care, stopping mass incarceration in the United States, and protecting undocumented children from deportation. She lost in the Democratic primary to Cuomo on September 13, 2018, with 34% of the vote to his 66%. Nixon was nominated as the gubernatorial candidate for the Working Families Party; the party threw its support to Cuomo after Nixon lost in the Democratic primary.

Nixon has been an advocate for LGBT rights in the United States, particularly the right of same-sex marriage. She met her wife at a 2002 gay rights rally, and announced her engagement at a rally for New York same-sex marriage in 2009. She received the Yale University Artist for Equality award in 2013 and a Visibility Award from the Human Rights Campaign in 2018.

Early life and education
Nixon was born in Manhattan, the only child of Walter Elmer Nixon Jr., a radio journalist from Texas, and Anne Elizabeth (née Knoll), an actress originally from Chicago. She credits her mother with "indoctrinating" her into theatre. She is of English and German descent. Her grandparents were Adolph Knoll, Etta Elizabeth Williams, Walter E. Nixon, and Grace Truman McCormack. Nixon's parents divorced when she was six years old. According to Nixon, her father was often unemployed and her mother was the household's main breadwinner: Nixon's mother worked on the game show To Tell the Truth, coaching the "impostors" who claimed to be the person described by the host.

Nixon made her first television appearance on the show at 9 as one of the "impostors", pretending to be a junior horse riding champion. Nixon was an actress all through her years at Hunter College Elementary School and Hunter College High School (class of 1984), often taking time away from school to perform in film and on stage. Nixon also acted in order to pay her way through Barnard College, where she received a B.A. in English Literature. Nixon was also a student in the Semester at Sea Program in the Spring of 1986.

Career

Early career
Nixon's first onscreen appearance was as an imposter on To Tell the Truth, where her mother worked. She began acting at 12 as the object of a wealthy schoolmate's crush in The Seven Wishes of a Rich Kid, a 1979 ABC Afterschool Special. She made her feature debut co-starring with Kristy McNichol and Tatum O'Neal in Little Darlings (1980). She made her Broadway debut as Dinah Lord in a 1980 revival of The Philadelphia Story. Alternating between film, TV, and stage, she did projects like the 1982 ABC movie My Body, My Child, the features Prince of the City (1981) and I Am the Cheese (1983), and the 1982 Off-Broadway productions of John Guare's Lydie Breeze.

In 1984, while a freshman at Barnard College, Nixon made theatrical history by simultaneously appearing in two hit Broadway plays directed by Mike Nichols. They were The Real Thing, where she played the daughter of Jeremy Irons and Christine Baranski; and Hurlyburly, where she played a young woman who encounters sleazy Hollywood executives. The two theaters were just two blocks apart and Nixon's roles were both short, so she could run from one to the other. Onscreen, she played the role of Salieri's maid/spy, Lorl, in Amadeus (1984). In 1985, she appeared alongside Jeff Daniels in Lanford Wilson's Lemon Sky at Second Stage Theatre.

She landed her first major supporting role in a movie as an intelligent teenager who aids her boyfriend (Christopher Collet) in building a nuclear bomb in Marshall Brickman's The Manhattan Project (1986). Nixon was part of the cast of the NBC miniseries The Murder of Mary Phagan (NBC, 1988) starring Jack Lemmon and Kevin Spacey, and portrayed the daughter of a presidential candidate (Michael Murphy) in Tanner '88 (1988), Robert Altman's political satire for HBO. She reprised the role for the 2004 sequel, Tanner on Tanner.

1990s
On stage, Nixon portrayed Juliet in a 1988 New York Shakespeare Festival production of Romeo and Juliet, and acted in the workshop production of Wendy Wasserstein's Pulitzer Prize-winning The Heidi Chronicles, playing several characters after it came to Broadway in 1989. She was the guest star in the second episode of the long running NBC television series Law & Order. She played the role of an agoraphobic woman in a February 1993 episode of Murder, She Wrote, titled "Threshold of Fear".

Nixon succeeded Marcia Gay Harden as Harper Pitt in Tony Kushner's Angels in America (1994), received a Tony nomination for her performance in Indiscretions (Les Parents Terribles) (1996), her sixth Broadway show, and, although she originally lost the part to another actress, eventually took over the role of Lala Levy in the Tony-winning The Last Night of Ballyhoo (1997).

Nixon was a founding member of the Off-Broadway theatrical troupe Drama Dept., which included Sarah Jessica Parker, Dylan Baker, John Cameron Mitchell and Billy Crudup among its actors, appearing in the group's productions of Kingdom on Earth (1996), June Moon and As Bees in Honey Drown (both 1997), Hope is the Thing with Feathers (1998), and The Country Club (1999).

She had supporting roles in Addams Family Values (1993), Baby's Day Out (1994), Marvin's Room (1996), and The Out-of-Towners (1999).

Stardom
She raised her profile significantly as one of the four regulars on HBO's successful comedy Sex and the City (1998–2004), as the lawyer Miranda Hobbes. Nixon received three Emmy Award nominations for Outstanding Supporting Actress in a Comedy Series (2002, 2003, 2004), winning the award in 2004, for the show's final season.

The immense popularity of the series led Nixon to enjoy her first leading role in a feature, playing a video artist who falls in love, despite her best efforts to avoid commitment, with a bisexual actor who just happens to be dating a gay man (her best friend) in Advice from a Caterpillar (2000), as well as starring opposite Scott Bakula in the holiday television movie Papa's Angels (2000). In 2002, she also landed a role in the indie comedy Igby Goes Down, and her turn in the theatrical production of Clare Boothe Luce's play The Women was captured for PBS' Stage on Screen series.

Post-Sex and the City, Nixon made a guest appearance on ER in 2005, as a mother who undergoes a tricky procedure to lessen the effects of a debilitating stroke. She followed up with a turn as Eleanor Roosevelt for HBO's Warm Springs (2005), which chronicled Franklin Delano Roosevelt's quest for a miracle cure for his polio. Nixon earned an Emmy nomination as Outstanding Lead Actress in a Miniseries or a Movie for her performance. In December 2005, she appeared in the Fox TV series House in the episode "Deception", as a patient who suffers a seizure.

In 2006, she appeared in David Lindsay-Abaire's Pulitzer Prize-winning drama Rabbit Hole in a Manhattan Theatre Club production, and won the Tony Award for Best Actress in a Leading Role (Play). (This part was later played by Nicole Kidman in the movie adaptation of the play.)

In 2008, she revived her role as Miranda Hobbes in the Sex and the City feature film, directed by HBO executive producer Michael Patrick King and co-starring the cast of the original series. Also in 2008, she won an Emmy for her guest appearance in an episode of Law & Order: Special Victims Unit, portraying a woman pretending to have dissociative identity disorder.

In 2009, Nixon won the Grammy Award for Best Spoken Word Album along with Beau Bridges and Blair Underwood for the album An Inconvenient Truth (Al Gore).

2010s
In March 2010, Nixon received the Vito Russo Award at the GLAAD Media Awards. The award is presented to an openly LGBT media professional "who has made a significant difference in promoting equality for the LGBT community". It was announced in June 2010 that Nixon would appear in four episodes of the Showtime series The Big C.

Nixon appeared in a Law & Order: Criminal Intent episode based on the problems surrounding the Broadway musical Spider-Man: Turn Off the Dark. Her character is "Amanda Reese, the high-strung and larger-than-life director behind a problem-plagued Broadway version of Icarus," loosely modeled after Spider-Man director Julie Taymor.

In 2012, Nixon starred as Professor Vivian Bearing in the Broadway debut of Margaret Edson's Pulitzer Prize–winning play Wit. Produced by the Manhattan Theatre Club, the play opened January 26, 2012 at the Samuel J. Friedman Theatre. Nixon received a Tony Award nomination for Best Actress in a Play for the performance.

In 2012, Nixon also starred as Petranilla in the TV miniseries of Ken Follett's World Without End broadcast on the ReelzChannel, alongside Ben Chaplin, Peter Firth, Charlotte Riley, and Miranda Richardson.

In 2015, Nixon appeared in two films which premiered at the 2015 Sundance Film Festival: Stockholm, Pennsylvania and James White. She received critical acclaim for both performances, especially for the latter, which many considered as "Oscar-worthy."

Nixon played the leading role of reclusive American poet Emily Dickinson in the biographical film A Quiet Passion directed and written by Terence Davies. The film premiered in February 2016 at the 66th Berlin International Film Festival. In May 2016, it was announced that Nixon would play Nancy Reagan in the upcoming television film adaptation of Killing Reagan. Filming began in late May and the film aired in October 2016.

Nixon appeared on Broadway in the revival of The Little Foxes, officially opening on April 19, 2017, at the Samuel J. Friedman Theatre. She alternated the roles of Regina and Birdie with Laura Linney, winning her second Tony Award for her performance as Birdie.

In January 2019, it was announced that Nixon will star in the upcoming Netflix drama series Ratched.

Political activism
Nixon is a long-time advocate for public education. She is a spokesperson for New York's Alliance for Quality Education, a public education fairness advocacy organization.

Nixon also has a history of advocacy in support of women's health.

She endorsed Bill de Blasio in the 2013 New York City mayoral election, who went on to win the Democratic nomination and the general election. Nixon campaigned actively for de Blasio, whom she had worked with since the early 2000s when campaigning against Michael Bloomberg's education policies. De Blasio credited Nixon and union leader George Gresham as the two "architects of (his) campaign" in the Democratic primaries, when he defeated the favorite Christine Quinn. After his election, de Blasio appointed Nixon as his representative to The Public Theater.

In the 2020 Democratic Party presidential primaries, Nixon endorsed Bernie Sanders before campaigning for him in early February 2020 in Las Vegas. She stated, "In the same terrifying and muscular way that Trump is a force for so much of what is bad in this country, in this world, Bernie has that same kind of muscularity of vision but for good. A candidate who is too beholden to big money and the establishment and just basically doesn’t want to rock the boat is never going to be a powerful enough counterbalance to what Donald Trump has to offer. You need someone as vigorous and who is wanting to turn the system upside down."

In 2023, Nixon signed an open letter expressing “serious concerns about editorial bias” in reporting by the New York Times on transgender people. The letter characterized the NYT’s coverage as using “an eerily familiar mix of pseudoscience and euphemistic, charged language”, and raised concerns regarding the NYT’s employment practices regarding trans contributors.

2018 New York gubernatorial election

In 2018, it was reported that Nixon was preparing a progressive challenge to the incumbent governor of New York, Andrew Cuomo. On March 19, 2018, she announced via Twitter that she was running for governor.

Nixon was expected to secure the nomination of the Working Families Party of New York during its annual convention in April 2018, thus guaranteeing her a spot on the general election ballot. On April 15, Nixon won 91.5 percent of the vote at the Party's statewide committee meeting after Cuomo withdrew himself from consideration at the last minute. Nixon stated that in the event that she did not also secure the Democratic nomination, she would "confer with the Working Families Party and we will make the decision we think is best".

The endorsement caused a schism in the party, as labor unions, including the Service Employees International Union, and Communications Workers of America, indicated they would not support the party in the election. The withdrawal, it was believed, would significantly hurt the party's finances which, in 2018, were at a level of $1.7 million and supported a statewide staff of about 15 people. The battle received considerable attention since there were concerns that Nixon might drain enough votes from Cuomo in the general election to allow a Republican to be elected (although Cuomo was comfortably leading the polls at the time). Cuomo had vigorously campaigned to get the nomination before withdrawing when it was clear he would not get it.

In contrast to Cuomo, Nixon supported the legalization of marijuana. The most important reason, she said, was racial justice. "People across all ethnic and racial lines use marijuana at roughly the same rate, but the arrests for marijuana are 80 percent black and Latino." To undo that damage, Nixon said that the revenues from legalization should be prioritized to the communities that had been harmed by them, as a form of "reparations." She said that people in jail on marijuana charges should be released, criminal records for marijuana use should be expunged, and marijuana revenues should be used to help them reenter society. However, many black leaders were offended by her use of the term "reparations".

On May 23, 2018, Nixon and other potential Democratic challengers to Cuomo were eliminated from the Democratic party endorsement at the state Democratic Convention after failing to meet the 25% state delegate threshold needed to appear on the ballot. Nixon filed a petition with 65,000 signatures, more than four times the 15,000 required, to force a primary election. The primary was held on September 13. With 93% of precincts reporting, Cuomo received 65% of votes and Nixon got 35%. On October 5, 2018, the Working Families Party removed Nixon's name from their ticket after agreeing to endorse Cuomo and Hochul, thus ensuring that Nixon would not appear on the general election ballot.

In August 2021, Cuomo was forced to resign as governor following allegations of sexual harassment by women who worked in his office. As a result of the scandal, he was stripped of the honorary Emmy given to him for his televised Covid briefings in 2020.  After he left office, Nixon tweeted on August 24, 2021: "The difference between me and Andrew Cuomo?  Neither of us is governor, but I still have my Emmy(s)." She has won two Emmys.

Personal life

From 1988 to 2003, Nixon was in a relationship with schoolteacher Danny Mozes. They have two children together. In June 2018, Nixon revealed that her older child is transgender.

In 2004, Nixon began dating education activist Christine Marinoni. Nixon and Marinoni became engaged in April 2009, and married in New York City on May 27, 2012, with Nixon wearing a custom-made, pale green dress by Carolina Herrera. Marinoni gave birth to a son in 2011.

Regarding her sexual orientation, Nixon remarked in 2007: "I don't really feel I've changed. I'd been with men all my life, and I'd never fallen in love with a woman. But when I did, it didn't seem so strange. I'm just a woman in love with another woman." She identified herself as bisexual in 2012, but now identifies as queer. Prior to the legalization of same-sex marriage in Washington state (Marinoni's home state), Nixon had taken a public stand supporting the issue, and hosted a fundraising event in support of Washington Referendum 74.

Nixon and her family attend Congregation Beit Simchat Torah, an LGBT synagogue.

In October 2006, Nixon was diagnosed with breast cancer during a routine mammography. She initially decided not to go public with her illness because she feared it might hurt her career, but in April 2008, she announced her battle with the disease in an interview with Good Morning America. Since then, Nixon has become a breast cancer activist. She convinced the head of NBC to air her breast cancer special in a prime time program, and became an Ambassador for Susan G. Komen for the Cure.

She and Marinoni live in the NoHo neighborhood of Manhattan, New York City.

Filmography

Film

Television

Stage

Awards and nominations

Honors 

 2008: Received the Muse Award presented by the New York Women in Film & Television.
 2010: Received the Vito Russo Award presented by the GLAAD Media Awards.
 2016: Received the Faith Hubley Memorial Award during the Provincetown International Film Festival.

Accolades 
Accolade references:

See also

 LGBT culture in New York City
 List of LGBT people from New York City

References

External links

 
 
 
 
 Interview with Nixon on educational advocacy
 

1966 births
Living people
20th-century American actresses
21st-century American actresses
Actresses from New York City
American actor-politicians
American child actresses
American film actresses
American people of English descent
American people of German descent
American television actresses
Audiobook narrators
Barnard College alumni
Grammy Award winners
Hunter College High School alumni
American LGBT actors
LGBT people from New York (state)
American LGBT politicians
Members of the Democratic Socialists of America
New York (state) Democrats
Outstanding Performance by a Supporting Actress in a Comedy Series Primetime Emmy Award winners
Tony Award winners
Progressivism in the United States
American women television directors
American television directors
American stage actresses
21st-century LGBT people
Queer actresses